Elections to Trafford Council were held on 2 May 1996. One-third of the council was up for election, with each successful candidate to serve a four-year term of office, expiring in 2000. The Labour Party gained overall control of the council, from no overall control.

After the election, the composition of the council was as follows:

Ward results

References

1996 English local elections
1996
1990s in Greater Manchester